This is a list of deputy prime ministers of Saint Vincent and the Grenadines.

Deputy prime ministers of Saint Vincent (2001–present)

See also
Governor-General of Saint Vincent and the Grenadines

Saint Vincent and the Grenadines, Deputy Prime Ministers
Politics of Saint Vincent and the Grenadines
Deputy Prime Minister
Deputy prime ministers